A hanging veil, also known as a flowing veil or charity veil, is a type of Christian headcovering, which is worn by some Christian women continually, in obedience to Paul the Apostle's command in . Hanging veils enjoy popularity in a diverse array of Christian denominations, especially those of the Anabaptist Christian tradition (such as Mennonites and Hutterites). In certain Conservative Mennonite Anabaptist congregationations of the Beachy Amish Mennonite tradition, an opaque hanging veil is permitted as an alternative to the kapp if it covers as much or more hair as the kapp, which traditionally is "of ample size to cover most of the hair". Opaque hanging veils are usually white or black in colour for modesty. Hanging veils are designed to drape over the natural curves of a woman's head and hang down a woman's neck. Certain denominations of Christianity provide guidelines regarding the headcovering; the Ministry Training Center of the Biblical Mennonite Alliance, for example, teaches:

Women who headcover with the hanging veil wear it throughout the day, with the exception of sleeping, based on Saint Paul's dictum that Christians are to "pray without ceasing", Saint Paul's teaching that women being unveiled is dishonourable, and as a reflection of the created order. Manuals of early Christianity, including the Didascalia Apostolorum and Pædagogus likewise instruct that a headcovering must be worn by a Christian woman both during prayer and worship, as well as in public.

See also 

Cape dress

References

Further reading

External links 
The Hanging Veil - Southern Atlantic Mennonite Conference
Why do Amish and Mennonite women wear head coverings? - Abner Showalter (Anabaptist Doctrine)
Traditional Plain Dress Women's Caps - Quaker Jane (Conservative Friends)
Comparing Amish Women's Head Coverings - Amish America

Anabaptism
Protestant religious clothing
Religious headgear
Veils